Dave Buchanan may refer to:

Dave Buchanan (cyclist), see The Hobbit's Tale
Dave Buchanan (Canadian football) (born 1948), running back in the Canadian Football League
Dave Buchanan (footballer, born 1873), Scottish footballer who played for Middlesbrough and Plymouth Argyle
Dave Buchanan, radio presenter on WGR, New York
Dave Buchanan, engineer on Raw and Elegy
Dave Buchanan (cricketer), for Botswana, see 2008 ICC World Cricket League Division Five

See also
David Buchanan (disambiguation)